"Infanta Marina" is one of a group of collected poems in Wallace Stevens' Harmonium, in this poem dealing with a seaside princess.

Interpretation
Helen Vendler (in Words Chosen Out of Desire) presents the poem as a "double scherzo" on her in the possessive sense and on of in its partitive and possessive sense. 

The long sequence of possessive phrases Vendler refers to may be enumerated as: 'of the motions', 'of her wrist', 'of her thought', 'of the plumes', 'of this creature', 'of this evening', 'of sails', 'of her fan', 'of the sea', and 'of the evening'. This litany in sequence using the possessive form involving repeated ofs shows syntactically what the poem states semantically, Vendler proposes: the interpenetration of mind and nature, the denial of "significant difference" among the objects of the various of-clauses. This semantics may be read as a naturalistic denial of metaphysical dualism between mind and matter, a natural twin to the reading of "Invective Against Swans" as mocking the dualistic soul and its dubious journey to a realm that transcends nature.

The princess of the sea in this poem may be compared to "donna" who is "sequestered over the sea" in "O Florida, Venereal Soil", and to "Fabliau of Florida", which in parallel fashion explores dissolution of boundaries in nature.

References
 Vendler. H. Words Chosen Out Of Desire. 1984: University of Tennessee Press.

1921 poems
American poems
Poetry by Wallace Stevens